The women's points race competition at the 2023 UEC European Track Championships was held on 11 February 2023.

Results
100 laps (25 km) were raced with 10 sprints.

References

Women's points race
European Track Championships – Women's points race